Mocis trifasciata  is a moth of the family Erebidae. It is found in the south-west Pacific region, including Samoa, Fiji, Hawaii, New Zealand, the Society Islands and Queensland.

The larvae feed on Vigna unguiculata, Oryza sativa and Agathis, Pueraria and Brachiaria species.

References

External links
Australian Caterpillars

Moths of Fiji
Moths of New Zealand
Moths of Queensland
Moths described in 1830
trifasciata